Slovak Bandy Association (Slovenská asociácia Bandy) is the governing body of bandy in Slovakia. It was founded 12 May 2017 and is based in Trenčianske Teplice, Trenčin Region. It was admitted to the Federation of International Bandy the same year.

National team

References

External links
 Official webpage

Federation of International Bandy members
Bandy governing bodies
Bandy
Bandy in Slovakia
Sport in Trenčín Region